Andrea Pratichetti (born 26 November 1988) is a retired Italian rugby union player who played for Mogliano as a centre in Top12 until 2021−22 season.

Pratichetti was raised at Rugby Roma, where his uncle Carlo was a player and then a coach. Andrea was then passed on to UR Capitolina's youth team, before being hired as a professional by Calvisano. At Calvisano he played alongside is older brother and Italian international Matteo. Andrea then joined Rovigo for a year, before signing for Treviso in 2010. He played for Benetton from 2010 to 2017.

He debuted for the Italian national rugby union team in 2012 against Canada.
From 2017 he is also part of the Italy Sevens squad also to participate at the Qualifying Tournament for the 2020 Summer Olympics and the 2020 World Rugby Sevens Challenger Series.

References

External links
 https://web.archive.org/web/20160303172713/http://origin.ercrugby.com/eng/matchcentre/players_statistics_archive.php?player=68808&includeref=dynamic
 http://www.itsrugby.fr/joueur_11797.html

1988 births
Living people
Benetton Rugby players
Italian rugby union players
Italy international rugby union players
Rugby union centres